James Benjamin Kingsley Newbury (born 13 May 1978) is an Australian politician. He has been a Liberal Party member of the Victorian Legislative Assembly since November 2018, representing the seat of Brighton. Newbury is the currently the Shadow Minister for Environment and Climate Change, Equality, Bay Protection, and the Shadow Special Minister for State.

Early life 
Newbury grew up in Malvern East, and his grandfather, Dr Charles Renton Newbury, was President of the World Dental Federation and a recipient of a CBE.

Newbury joined the Liberal Party in 1999.

Career 
Newbury was a Liberal staffer in Canberra and Melbourne before his election, and holds three degrees.

Newbury's university degrees include a Juris Doctor (Post Graduate Level Law Degree), a Master of Business (Law), and a Bachelor of Business (Law).

In the Liberal Party Newbury worked as a Senior Adviser to the Victorian Premier Denis Napthine, a Parliamentary Adviser to the Hon Christopher Pyne, a Parliamentary Adviser to the Hon Joe Hockey; and worked for a number of other Parliamentarians including Senator Richard Alston, the Hon Tony Abbott, and Senator Mitch Fifield.

Between December 2018 and September 2021, Newbury held the positions of Shadow Assistant Minister for Wastewatch and Shadow Assistant Minister for Freedom of Information.

Between March 2021 and September 2021, Newbury held the position of Shadow Assistant Minister for Scrutiny of Government.

Between September 2021 and February 2022, Newbury held the position of Shadow Assistant Treasurer, Shadow Minister for Economic Development, Shadow Minister for Scrutiny of Government and Shadow Minister for Government Services and Public Sector Integrity.

Since September 2021, Newbury currently holds the positions of Shadow Minister for Equality, Shadow Minister for Bay Protection, Shadow Minister for Environment and Climate Change and Shadow Special Minister of State.

Newbury defeated former Bayside Council Mayor, Felicity Frederico to retain Liberal Party preselection for the 2022 Victorian state election and then defeated Labor’s Louise Crawford and Frederico, who ran as an independent at that election.

Politics 

Newbury was a backer of Michael Kroger to be the president of the Liberal Party in Victoria. He also was a close ally of Marcus Bastiaan, who claimed to control a large portion of the administrative committee. This group generally aimed to install conservative politicians, or have moderates toe a more conservative line. Newbury is considered a moderate who has "sought to return the party to its centre."

Newbury won preselection for the district of Brighton in 2016, receiving support from prominent outgoing MP Louise Asher who described Newbury as "one of the most outstanding individuals with whom I have had the pleasure to work" in a reference letter.

This was the cause of some disappointment in the Liberal ranks, as it would lead to a reduction in their female representation. Newbury's victory came with allegations of branch stacking.

Newbury won the seat in an electoral landslide for the Labor Party but suffered an 8.7% swing against him, and was in danger of losing the previously safe Liberal seat to a relatively unheard of 19 year old who had only joined the Labor party two months prior and whose entire electoral campaign budget was $1750.
 He was criticised during the campaign for campaigning to close a homeless shelter in his electorate.

Political positions

Duck hunting 
Newbury has been an outspoken critic of duck hunting, and called for the practice to be stopped in his maiden speech.

In his maiden speech Newbury said "though hunters are required to carry out ducks killed, hundreds of birds, including endangered species supposedly protected from being shot, are found dead during the season."

LGBTQ issues 
Newbury is a prominent advocate for the LGBTQ community within the Victorian Liberal Party, in his capacity as Shadow Minister for Equality. He has backed positions including, maintaining Victoria's strict anti-conversion therapy laws, funding LGBTQ community radio and providing a "dedicated professional legal support service" to LGBTQ Victorians.

Newbury drew considerable media attention when he gave an "iron clad guarantee" that the Victorian Liberals would not amend new laws banning gay conversion therapy. Newbury's moderate views angered more conservative elements, including "hard-right Liberal backbencher" Bernie Finn who has since defected to the DLP.

Environment & climate change 
In July 2022, Newbury announced a plan to halve emissions by 2030 and legislate the reduction target. He said the plan proved the "Victorian Liberals and Nationals are serious about climate change and have a sensible plan to achieve net-zero based on real solutions, not ideology".

Newbury has also been a leading opposition voice against culls to Victoria's feral brumby population, pledging to stop the eradication, if elected.

Lockdowns 
Newbury has been a regular and vocal critic of the Victorian lockdowns.

Newbury received considerable backlash for sharing a photo on social media that showed a girl's self-harm. He linked the post to the COVID-19 lockdown and the strain on mental health. Due to the significant backlash, Newbury removed the post from Twitter two hours after he posted it.

Health 
In his role on the Public Accounts and Estimates Committee (PAEC), Newbury accused the then health minister Martin Foley of having blood on his hands, following 21 deaths linked to long ambulance waiting times.

Abortion 
Newbury is a supporter of abortion rights, who criticised a Liberal Party colleague in May 2022, calling his anti-abortion views "deeply disturbing and dangerous". He also stated that governments should not "legislate control over a woman's body".

Crime & law enforcement 
Newbury has raised the issue of crime on numerous occasions.

In May 2021, Newbury stated that a local park had faced issues of “rape, sexual assault and violent attacks”. He later raised the issue with the then Deputy Premier James Merlino

Newbury gained more attention for his allegations that Victorian Premier Daniel Andrews had engaged in "victim blaming" in his response to concerns raised by celebrity Bec Judd. Newbury went on to describe the response from Premier Andrews as "a deeply disturbing way for a Premier to respond to a woman’s concern about her safety.”

Newbury has backed the idea that police should be able to racially profile people that they question, and to store that information for future reference.

References

1978 births
Living people
Liberal Party of Australia members of the Parliament of Victoria
Members of the Victorian Legislative Assembly
Monash University alumni
RMIT University alumni
21st-century Australian politicians
Politicians from Melbourne
People from Malvern, Victoria